Lucas Fernandes may refer to:

Lucas Fernandes (footballer, born 1994), Brazilian football forward who plays in Japan for Hokkaido Consadole Sapporo
Lucas Fernandes (footballer, born 1997), Brazilian football midfielder who plays in Portugal for Portimonense